Totentag is an electronic opera  and the twenty-ninth album by Klaus Schulze. It was originally released in 1994; its libretto is inspired by the last days of the expressionist poet Georg Trakl.  This is the seventh and last of the early-1990s Klaus Schulze albums not to be reissued by Revisited Records. Totentag was released after Schulze's Silver Edition 10-disc CD box set, technically making this album his thirty-ninth.

Track listing
All tracks composed by Klaus Schulze.

Disc 1

Disc 2

References

External links
 Totentag at the official site of Klaus Schulze
 

Klaus Schulze albums
1994 albums
Rock operas